Trimeresurus sumatranus is a venomous pitviper species found in Thailand, Malaysia and Indonesia. Arboreal, its coloration is pale green with a red tail. Common names include Sumatran pitviper, Sumatran tree viper, and Sumatran pit viper.

Description
Trimeresurus sumatranus is a large heavy-bodied pitviper, with a prehensile tail. Adults may attain  SVL (snout–vent length), with fangs over 10 mm (⅜ inch) long.

It is an arboreal species that is pale green in color with a red tail. The dorsal scales are edged with black, which may form crossbands in more mature specimens. There is a white or yellow stripe on each side along the first row of dorsal scales. Ventrally it is greenish or yellowish, and the ventral scales may be thinly edged with black.

Scalation includes 21 (23) rows of dorsal scales at midbody, 183–190/182–191 ventral scales in males/females, 57–66/55–64 subcaudal scales in males/females, and 8–10 supralabial scales.

Habitat
In Borneo it inhabits lowland forests at elevations below .

Behavior
It is nocturnal, climbing onto low branches to hunt its prey.

Diet
The diet consists mainly of small mammals, birds, and frogs.

Geographic range
Found in southern Thailand, West and East Malaysia (Sabah and Sarawak on Borneo) and Indonesia (Bangka, Billiton, Borneo, Sumatra and the nearby islands of Simalur, Nias, and possibly the Mentawai Islands [Sipora]). The type locality given is "Sumatra."

According to Gumprecht et al. (2004), the records regarding its occurrence in the Mentawai Islands are probably based on T. hageni.

Venom
Because it is a large snake with large fangs, Trimeresurus sumatranus can inject large quantities of venom. Fatalities from its bite have been reported, and it should be considered extremely dangerous.

References

Further reading
Raffles, T.S. 1822. Second Part of the Descriptive Catalogue of a Zoological Collection made in [sic] the Island of Sumatra and its vicinity. Transactions of the Linnean Society of London 13 (2): 277-340. (Coluber sumatranus, p. 334.)

sumatranus
Snakes of Southeast Asia
Reptiles of Indonesia
Reptiles of Malaysia
Reptiles of Singapore
Reptiles of Thailand
Reptiles of Borneo
Fauna of Sumatra
Reptiles described in 1822
Taxa named by Thomas Stamford Raffles